The Inspector-General of Police (abbreviation: IGP;  — KPN), also known as the Chief of Police, is the highest-ranking police officer of the Royal Malaysian Police (RMP). Assisted by the Deputy Inspector-General of Police (DIG), he reports to the Minister of Home Affairs. The IGP is based at Bukit Aman, Kuala Lumpur which is the Headquarters of the RMP.

The current IGP is Tan Sri Acryl Sani Abdullah Sani – having succeeded his predecessor, Tan Sri Abdul Hamid Bador in May 2021.

Inspectors-General of Police currently are mandated to retire once reach the age of 60, but may be extended upon exceptional circumstances.

History 
During the (Malacca Sultanate) (1400–1511), the position that resembles modern chief of police is the Temenggong ('Chief of Public Security'). After the fall of Malacca and up to the 17th century, Malaya was under several western powers including Portugal, the Netherlands and Britain, and the task of securing public safety in Malaya fell to these nations' militaries.

In 1807, the British administration in Malaya has approved the Charter of Justice. Under the Charter, British administrations allowed a police force comprises locals to be formed. Penang is the first to establish their police force and James Carnegy was appointed to be the first Sheriff of Prince of Wales Islands (the then name for Penang). Malacca is the second state to established its police force which is in 1827 and other states follows — Johor in 1882, the Federated Malay States in 1896, Kedah and Kelantan in 1909 and Terengganu in 1914. Captain Charles Henry Syers who was the Selangor Commissioner of Police was appointed to be the first Federated Malay States' Commissioner of Police. For North Borneo, Sarawak established its police force namely the Sarawak Rangers, in 1862, and Sabah in 1882.

After World War II and the Japanese occupation of Malaya, the British administration has merged all police forces in Malaya into Malayan Union Police and based in Kuala Lumpur. After the independence of Malaya, the name was changed to Federation of Malaya Police. On 16 September 1963, Sabah, Sarawak and Singapore merged with Federation of Malaya and forming Malaysia. The name of the police force once again changed to its current name — the Royal Malaysia Police. Commissioner Claude Fenner, who was the Federation of Malaya's Commissioner of Police was appointed to become the first Inspectors-General of Police of Malaysia.

List of the Inspectors-General of Police
Since 1958, total have 13 Inspector-General of Police has been appointed. The list were:

Living former Inspectors-General

References